The Kennedy Hill Farm is a historic farmstead on Kennedy Hill Road in Goffstown, New Hampshire.  The property exhibits 150 years of agricultural history, with a well-crafted c. 1800 farmhouse built using regionally distinctive joinery skills. The property was listed on the National Register of Historic Places in 1984.

Description and history
The Kennedy Hill Farm is located in a rural setting in eastern Goffstown, on both sides of Kennedy Hill Road north of Addison Road. The property, now  in size, includes the main house, a barn, and a 19th-century shed. Most of the land is open fields; Kennedy Hill Road is lined by a row of mature maples. The main house, located on the west side of the road, is a two-story wood-frame structure, with a hip roof, central chimney, and clapboarded exterior. The interior follows a central chimney plan, with parlors on either side. These rooms are richly decorated in Federal period wood carving that is stylistically distinctive to the region, with especially fine fireplace surrounds and window molding. The barn is located across the street.

The main house was built c. 1800 by Thomas Kennedy, a joiner. Kennedy was a well-known and successful builder in the area, who was responsible for the construction of several area public buildings, including churches and town halls. The interior of this Federal-style house retains many examples of his craft, which is rooted in a melding of traditions from New England's early settlers and those of Scottish Presbyterians who settled Londonderry early in the 18th century.

See also
National Register of Historic Places listings in Hillsborough County, New Hampshire

References

Houses on the National Register of Historic Places in New Hampshire
Houses completed in 1800
Houses in Hillsborough County, New Hampshire
Goffstown, New Hampshire
National Register of Historic Places in Hillsborough County, New Hampshire